Curve Lake First Nation 35 is an Ojibwe Native reserve 14 km north of Peterborough, Ontario.  It serves as the landbase for the Curve Lake First Nation.  The reserve occupies a peninsula located between Lake Chemong and Buckhorn Lake, surrounded by the township of Selwyn, as well as several neighbouring small islands in Buckhorn Lake.

The Curve Lake First Nation occupies two reserves (including Curve Lake 35A) and shares a third, the nearby Islands in the Trent Waters, with the Hiawatha First Nation and the Scugog First Nation. Curve Lake First Nation 35 occupies a peninsula between Buckhorn Lake, Lake Chemong, and Little Mud Lake. Curve Lake 35A is on Fox Island in Buckhorn Lake, and Islands in the Trent Waters is on islands in Buckhorn Lake, Pigeon Lake and Stony Lake.

 (wild rice) is an annual plant that grows in the Kawartha Lakes. The seeds ripen in September and fall into the lake to ensure future crops.

Famous Residents 

 Kris Jacobs: Triple AAA Hockey Goalie for Peterborough Petes
 Drew Haydon Taylor: Playwright

References

Indian and Northern Affairs Canada - First Nation Profile "Curve Lake"

External links
Curve Lake's website

Mississauga reserves in Ontario
Communities in Peterborough County
Mississaugas